Krasnodar-1, also Krasnodar-Glavny ( or ) is a junction railway station of North Caucasus Railway, located in Krasnodar, the administrative center of Krasnodar Krai. It is the main railway terminal of the city.

History
The railway station Krasnodar-1 was first opened in 1889. The station building was completely overhauled in the early 21st century and now is not only the main railway station of Krasnodar, but throughout the North Caucasus Railway, which was formed in 1918 after the nationalization of private Railways by the RSFSR government, of the Armavir-Tuapse railway and the Vladikavkaz Railway.

Trains
From Krasnodar railway station there are trains to all Russian regions and also to Belarus, Ukraine and Abkhazia.

References

External links

 Train times on Yandex
 Train times and booking on Russian Raulways website
 Old photos of the station

Railway stations in Krasnodar Krai
Railway stations in the Russian Empire opened in 1889
Buildings and structures in Krasnodar Krai
Buildings and structures in Krasnodar
Cultural heritage monuments of regional significance in Krasnodar Krai